Matronula is a genus of moths belonging to the subfamily Tortricinae of the family Tortricidae.

See also
List of Tortricidae genera

References

Tortricidae genera
Tortricinae